Candola is a village and census town in Ponda Sub-District, North Goa district in the state of Goa, India. It is located in the Novas Conquistas region of the state.

History 

Candola was founded by the Portuguese, in 1783, after Raja Bahadur Khem Savant III from the Kingdom of Sawantwadi ceded its lands to Portugal, in order to receive military help against the Kingdom of Kolhapur.

Geography 
The Mandovi River flows to through village's East and North, separating it from the village of Amona. Another waterbody - the Cumbarjua Canal, which is a distributary of the Mandovi, flows on its North-Western border, separating it from the island of St Estevam. There is a bridge over River, connecting it to the inner parts of Goa, and another over the canal, connecting it to the island.

References
 

Cities and towns in North Goa district
Villages in North Goa district